Carrol Boyes was a South African artist, businesswoman, and former teacher that is best known as the founder of the Carrol Boyes Kitchen and eating utensil design company.

Early life and career
Boyes grew up in the area around Tzaneen and Pretoria in South Africa and went on to study sculpture at the University of Pretoria obtaining a degree in Fine Arts. After graduation she taught art and English in Hout Bay.

Business
Boyes left teaching in 1989 when she turned 35 to focus on founding a company to design and produce crafts from her home in Cape Town.  Starting with jewelry made from clay and cuttlefish and then moving on to create her first items for sale from copper. She started selling her work from a stall in Greenmarket Square.  By 1992 the company opened its first factory in Limpopo followed by another facility in Paarden Eiland, Cape Town.  By the time of her death the company had grown to 45 outlets across South Africa with her products sold in 51 countries.

References 

University of Pretoria alumni
South African contemporary artists
21st-century South African artists
20th-century South African artists
21st-century South African businesswomen
21st-century South African businesspeople
20th-century South African businesswomen
20th-century South African businesspeople
1954 births
2019 deaths